Lechenaultia aphylla is a species of flowering plant in the family Goodeniaceae and is endemic to arid parts of inland Australia. It is a glabrous herb or subshrub with spreading branches, almost no leaves, and yellow, tube-shaped flowers.

Description

Taxonomy
Lechenaultia aphylla was first formally described in 1992 by David A. Morrison in the Flora of Australia from specimens collected near Mount Finke by David Eric Symon in 1987. The specific epithet (aphylla) means "without leaves".

Distribution and habitat
This leschenaultia has been recorded between sand dunes and on flats in open shrubland and is only known from a few locations near Yellabine north of Ceduna in South Australia and in the Great Victoria Desert in Western Australia.

Conservation status
Lechenaultia aphylla is listed as "Priority One" by the Government of Western Australia Department of Biodiversity, Conservation and Attractions, meaning that it is known from only one or a few locations which are potentially at risk.

References

aphylla
Garden plants of Australia
Plants described in 1992
Flora of South Australia
Flora of Western Australia